Fernando Soriano Marco (born 24 September 1979) is a Spanish former professional footballer who played as a central midfielder. He is the current sporting director of UD Ibiza.

He spent most of his 19-year career with Almería, totalling ten seasons in two different spells. In La Liga, where he also represented Zaragoza and Osasuna, he amassed totals of 229 games and 21 goals, adding the same amount of matches and 33 goals in Segunda División. 

Over nine months and starting in 2016, Soriano also managed Almería.

Club career
Soriano was born in Zaragoza, Aragon. A product of hometown Real Zaragoza's youth ranks, he was loaned to second division side Recreativo de Huelva before appearing with the first team, which would befall during the 2002–03 season, also in the second level.

In La Liga, Soriano proved a very useful midfield element. In the 2003–04 campaign, he scored the winner in 2–1 wins over Racing de Santander and FC Barcelona while also helping his team to the conquest of the Copa del Rey.

Soriano joined UD Almería for 2005–06, netting seven goals in his first year. He was an instrumental figure in the club's first-ever top division promotion the next season, reuniting with former Zaragoza teammate Corona; both players were instrumental the following campaign, as the Andalusians went on to finish eighth in their maiden experience in the top tier.

Soriano had a successful season overall in 2009–10, as Almería retained its status for the third consecutive year. Without the presence of striker Álvaro Negredo, he was much more depended upon in scoring matters and netted seven times in 35 games, joint-second in the team as they finished in 13th position (he also collected 13 yellow cards) – he spent many matches appearing as a supporting striker.

On 21 May 2010, free agent Soriano signed for 2+1 years with CA Osasuna. He made his official debut for the Navarrese in the season opener, a 0–0 home draw against former team Almería.

After a disappointing campaign overall, Soriano terminated his contract with Osasuna and returned to his previous club in late July 2011, penning a three-year deal. He scored a career-best 12 goals from 39 appearances in the 2012–13 campaign, helping the team return to the top flight after a two-year absence.

On 17 May 2016, aged 36, Soriano retired and was immediately appointed manager of Almería until the end of the division two season. After managing to avoid relegation and remain unbeaten in his four games in charge (two wins and two draws), he renewed his contract for a further year.

Soriano signed as sporting director at UD Ibiza in December 2018.

Career statistics

Club

Managerial statistics

Honours
Zaragoza
Copa del Rey: 2003–04
Supercopa de España: 2004

References

External links

1979 births
Living people
Footballers from Zaragoza
Spanish footballers
Association football midfielders
La Liga players
Segunda División players
Segunda División B players
Real Zaragoza B players
Real Zaragoza players
Recreativo de Huelva players
UD Almería players
CA Osasuna players
Spain youth international footballers
Spanish football managers
Segunda División managers
UD Almería managers